John Clifford Heed (1862–1908) was an American composer and musician, best known for composing over 60 marches.

Early life and education
Born in Hackettstown, New Jersey, on April 23, 1862, Heed began his musical career with the Hackettstown Cornet Band by the age of 11. By the time he reached the age of 17 he was the leader of this band and he had mastered with astonishing rapidity the intricacies of harmony and counterpoint. He became proficient on the piano and violin, and could play most band instruments.

Career
In 1882 Heed had the opportunity to travel with a noted English orchestra through the United States. The cornetist that had come with the orchestra became ill and was sent back to England.  Heed was highly recommended and was engaged to fill the cornetist's place. He received encomiums from the press and public in every city and town visited. A year later, in 1883, Heed accepted an engagement to become the leader of the Providence Brigade Band. This was a position that he held until he was called back to New Jersey to conduct another orchestra and band. Soon thereafter, he went to Worcester, Massachusetts and spent eight years as a teacher of bands. His next position was a cornetist for Voss's First Regiment Band in Newark, New Jersey. It was after the Metronome article was written that Mr. Heed went with John Philip Sousa's band as a soloist and arranger before contracting tuberculosis in the 1890s and dying in Newark, New Jersey on February 12, 1908. He died leaving no children. He was buried near his family in Union Cemetery in Hackettstown, New Jersey.

According to local legend in Hackettstown, New Jersey it is claimed that it was Heed who actually wrote for Sousa his great masterpiece: "The Stars and Stripes Forever". This is corroborated by a story entitled "Hackettstown's Early Musicians" in the book entitled "The Story of Hackettstown New Jersey from 1754 to 1955" by J. Harold Nunn at pages 99–101.

His original cornet along with various photographs may be seen at the Hackettstown Historical Society Museum, in Hackettstown, New Jersey where the cornet is on loan from Mr. Heed's family.

Heed's best known works include the marches In Storm and Sunshine, Regimental Pride, Metronome Prize, Clipper, The Rouser, and General Miles. He also composed polkas, waltzes, orchestral works, and pieces for cornet and piano. He is occasionally referred to as the "March Wizard" by Carl Fischer, one of America's oldest music houses and who published Mr. Heed's compositions.

References

1862 births
1908 deaths
American male composers
American composers
American cornetists
People from Hackettstown, New Jersey
19th-century American male musicians